Dušan Masár (born 4 June 1962) is a Czech former wrestler. He competed in the men's Greco-Roman 100 kg at the 1988 Summer Olympics.

References

External links
 

1962 births
Living people
Czech male sport wrestlers
Olympic wrestlers of Czechoslovakia
Wrestlers at the 1988 Summer Olympics
People from Teplice nad Bečvou
Sportspeople from the Olomouc Region